A lightweight web browser is a web browser that sacrifices some of the features of a mainstream web browser in order to reduce the consumption of system resources, and especially to minimize the memory footprint.

The tables below compare notable lightweight web browsers. Several of them use a common layout engine, but each has a unique combination of features and a potential niche. The minimal user interface in surf, for example, does not have tabs, whereas xombrero can be driven with vi-like keyboard commands.

Four of the browsers compared—Lynx, w3m, Links, and ELinks—are designed for text mode, and can function in a terminal emulator. Eww is limited to working within Emacs. Links 2 has both a text-based user interface and a graphical user interface. w3m is, in addition to being a web browser, also a terminal pager.

Overview

Operating system support 

Notes

Features
Test scores reflect the version of the browser engine in use. Generally, a lower score indicates an older version of the browser engine.

Notes

See also
 Comparison of web browsers
 List of web browsers for Unix and Unix-like operating systems

References

Further reading
 
 
 

Lightweight web browsers